Emmanuelle Marie Charpentier (born 11 December 1968) is a French professor and researcher in microbiology, genetics, and biochemistry. As of 2015, she has been a director at the Max Planck Institute for Infection Biology in Berlin. In 2018, she founded an independent research institute, the Max Planck Unit for the Science of Pathogens. In 2020, Charpentier and American biochemist Jennifer Doudna of the University of California, Berkeley, were awarded the Nobel Prize in Chemistry "for the development of a method for genome editing" (through CRISPR). This was the first science Nobel Prize ever won by two women only.

Early life and education 
Born in 1968 in Juvisy-sur-Orge in France, Charpentier studied biochemistry, microbiology, and genetics at the Pierre and Marie Curie University (which became the Faculty of Science of Sorbonne University) in Paris. She was a graduate student at the Institut Pasteur from 1992 to 1995 and was awarded a research doctorate. Charpentier's PhD work investigated molecular mechanisms involved in antibiotic resistance. Her paternal grandfather was an Armenian who escaped to France during the Armenian genocide and met her grandmother in Marseille.

Career and research 

Charpentier worked as a university teaching assistant at Pierre and Marie Curie University from 1993 to 1995 and as a postdoctoral fellow at the Institut Pasteur from 1995 to 1996. She moved to the US and worked as a postdoctoral fellow at Rockefeller University in New York from 1996 to 1997. During this time, Charpentier worked in the lab of microbiologist Elaine Tuomanen. Tuomanen's lab investigated how the pathogen Streptococcus pneumoniae utilizes mobile genetic elements to alter its genome. Charpentier also helped to demonstrate how S. pneumoniae develops vancomycin resistance.

Charpentier worked as an assistant research scientist at the New York University Medical Center from 1997 to 1999. There she worked in the lab of Pamela Cowin, a skin-cell biologist interested in mammalian gene manipulation. Charpentier published a paper exploring the regulation of hair growth in mice. She held the position of Research Associate at the St. Jude Children's Research Hospital and at the Skirball Institute of Biomolecular Medicine in New York from 1999 to 2002.

After five years in the United States, Charpentier returned to Europe and became the lab head and a guest professor at the Institute of Microbiology and Genetics, University of Vienna, from 2002 to 2004. In 2004, Charpentier published her discovery of an RNA molecule involved in the regulation of virulence-factor synthesis in Streptococcus pyogenes. From 2004 to 2006 she was lab head and an assistant professor at the Department of Microbiology and Immunobiology. In 2006 she became a private docent (Microbiology) and received her habilitation at the Centre of Molecular Biology. From 2006 to 2009 she worked as lab head and associate professor at the Max F. Perutz Laboratories.

Charpentier moved to Sweden and became lab head and associate professor at the Laboratory for Molecular Infection Medicine Sweden (MIMS), at Umeå University. She held the position of group leader from 2008 to 2013 and was visiting professor from 2014 to 2017. She moved to Germany to act as department head and W3 Professor at the Helmholtz Centre for Infection Research in Braunschweig and the Hannover Medical School from 2013 until 2015. In 2014 she became an Alexander von Humboldt Professor.

In 2015 Charpentier accepted an offer from the German Max Planck Society to become a scientific member of the society and a director at the Max Planck Institute for Infection Biology in Berlin. Since 2016, she has been an Honorary Professor at Humboldt University in Berlin; since 2018, she is the Founding and acting director of the Max Planck Unit for the Science of Pathogens. Charpentier retained her position as visiting professor at Umeå University until the end of 2017 when a new donation from the Kempe Foundations and the Knut and Alice Wallenberg Foundation allowed her to offer more young researchers positions within research groups of the MIMS Laboratory.

CRISPR/Cas9 
Charpentier is best known for her Nobel-winning work of deciphering the molecular mechanisms of a bacterial immune system, called CRISPR/Cas9, and repurposing it into a tool for genome editing. In particular, she uncovered a novel mechanism for the maturation of a non-coding RNA which is pivotal in the function of CRISPR/Cas9. Specifically, Charpentier demonstrated that a small RNA called tracrRNA is essential for the maturation of crRNA.

In 2011, Charpentier met Jennifer Doudna at a research conference and they began a collaboration. Working with Doudna's laboratory, Charpentier's laboratory showed that Cas9 could be used to make cuts in any DNA sequence desired. The method they developed involved the combination of Cas9 with easily created synthetic "guide RNA" molecules. Synthetic guide RNA is a chimera of crRNA and tracrRNA; therefore, this discovery demonstrated that the CRISPR-Cas9 technology could be used to edit the genome with relative ease. Researchers worldwide have employed this method successfully to edit the DNA sequences of plants, animals, and laboratory cell lines. Since its discovery, CRISPR has revolutionized genetics by allowing scientists to edit genes to probe their role in health and disease and to develop genetic therapies with the hope that it will prove safer and more effective than the first generation of gene therapies.

In 2013, Charpentier co-founded CRISPR Therapeutics and ERS Genomics along with Shaun Foy and Rodger Novak.

Awards 

In 2015, Time magazine designated Charpentier one of the Time 100 most influential people in the world (together with Jennifer Doudna). Charpentier Awards are as follows:

Nobel Prize in Chemistry, the Breakthrough Prize in Life Sciences, the Louis-Jeantet Prize for Medicine, the Gruber Foundation International Prize in Genetics, the Leibniz Prize, the Tang Prize, the Japan Prize, and the Kavli Prize in Nanoscience. She has won the BBVA Foundation Frontiers of Knowledge Award jointly with Jennifer Doudna and Francisco Mojica.

 2009 – Theodor Körner Prize for Science and Culture
 2011 – The Fernström Prize for young and promising scientists
 2014 – Alexander von Humboldt Professorship
 2014 – The Göran Gustafsson Prize for Molecular Biology (Royal Swedish Academy of Sciences)
 2014 – Dr. Paul Janssen Award for Biomedical Research (shared with Jennifer Doudna)
 2014 – The Jacob Heskel Gabbay Award (shared with Feng Zhang and Jennifer Doudna)
 2015 – Time 100: Pioneers (shared with Jennifer Doudna)
 2015 – The Breakthrough Prize in Life Sciences (shared with Jennifer Doudna)
 2015 – Louis-Jeantet Prize for Medicine
 2015 – The Ernst Jung Prize in Medicine
 2015 – Princess of Asturias Awards (shared with Jennifer Doudna)
 2015 – Gruber Foundation International Prize in Genetics (shared with Jennifer Doudna)
 2015 – , from German National Academy of Science, Leopoldina
 2015 – Massry Prize
 2015 – The Family Hansen Award
 2016 – Otto Warburg Medal
 2016 – L'Oréal-UNESCO "For Women in Science" Award
 2016 – Leibniz Prize from the German Research Foundation
 2016 – Canada Gairdner International Award (shared with Jennifer Doudna and Feng Zhang)
 2016 – Warren Alpert Foundation Prize
 2016 – Paul Ehrlich and Ludwig Darmstaedter Prize (jointly with Jennifer Doudna)
 2016 – Tang Prize (shared with Jennifer Doudna and Feng Zhang)
 2016 – HFSP Nakasone Award (jointly with Jennifer Doudna)
 2016 – Knight (Chevalier) French National Order of the Legion of Honour
 2016 – Meyenburg Prize
 2016 – Wilhelm Exner Medal
 2016 – John Scott Award
 2017 – BBVA Foundation Frontiers of Knowledge Award (jointly with Jennifer Doudna and Francisco Mojica)
 2017 – Japan Prize (jointly with Jennifer Doudna)
 2017 – Albany Medical Center Prize (jointly with Jennifer Doudna, Luciano Marraffini, Francisco Mojica, and Feng Zhang)
 2017 – Pour le Mérite
 2018 – Kavli Prize in Nanoscience (jointly with Jennifer Doudna and Virginijus Šikšnys)
 2018 – Austrian Decoration for Science and Art
 2018 – Bijvoet Medal of the Bijvoet Center for Biomolecular Research of Utrecht University
 2018 – Harvey Prize (jointly with Jennifer Doudna and Feng Zhang)
 2019 – Scheele Award of the Swedish Pharmaceutical Society
 2019 – Knight Commander's Cross of the Order of Merit of the Federal Republic of Germany
 2020 – Wolf Prize in Medicine (jointly with Jennifer Doudna)
 2020 – Nobel Prize in Chemistry (jointly with Jennifer Doudna)

Honorary doctorate degrees 
 2016 – École Polytechnique Fédérale de Lausanne
 2016 – KU, (Catholic University) Leuven, Belgium
 2016 – New York University (NYU)
 2017 – Faculty of Medicine, Umeå University, Sweden
 2017 – University of Western Ontario, London, Canada
 2017 – Hong Kong University of Science and Technology
 2018 – Université catholique de Louvain, Belgium
 2018 – University of Cambridge
 2018 – University of Manchester
 2019 – McGill University, Canada

Memberships 
 2014 – European Molecular Biology Organisation
 2015 – National Academy of Sciences Leopoldina
 2016 – Berlin-Brandenburg Academy of Sciences
 2016 – Austrian Academy of Sciences
 2016 – Royal Swedish Academy of Sciences
 2017 – U.S. National Academy of Sciences, Foreign Associate
 2017 – National Academy of Technologies of France
 2017 – French Académie des sciences
 2018 – European Academy of Sciences and Arts
 2021 – Pontifical Academy of Sciences

In popular culture 
In 2019, Charpentier was a featured character in the play STEM FEMMES by Philadelphia theater company Applied Mechanics.

In 2021, Walter Isaacson detailed the story of Jennifer Doudna and her collaboration with Charpentier leading to the discovery of CRISPR/CAS-9, in the biography The Code Breaker: Jennifer Doudna, Gene Editing, and the Future of the Human Race.

References

External links 

 
 Extensive biography of Emmanuelle Charpentier at the Max Planck Unit for the Science of Pathogens
 Umeå University Staff Directory: Emmanuelle Charpentier
 Molecular Infection Medicine Sweden – Short Curriculum Vitae of Emmanuelle Charpentier
 Crispr Therapeutics: Scientific Founders
 Emmanuelle Charpentier to become a Director at the Max Planck Institute for Infection Biology in Berlin
 

Nobel laureates in Chemistry
1968 births
Living people
People from Juvisy-sur-Orge
Bijvoet Medal recipients
French immunologists
French microbiologists
French Nobel laureates
French women academics
Foreign associates of the National Academy of Sciences
Kavli Prize laureates in Nanoscience
Knights Commander of the Order of Merit of the Federal Republic of Germany
L'Oréal-UNESCO Awards for Women in Science laureates
Members of the Pontifical Academy of Sciences
Members of the German Academy of Sciences Leopoldina
Members of the European Molecular Biology Organization
Recipients of the Pour le Mérite (civil class)
Theodor Körner Prize recipients
Academic staff of Umeå University
Wolf Prize in Medicine laureates
Women biochemists
Women microbiologists
Women Nobel laureates
Genome editing
Genetic engineering
Non-coding RNA
Scientific American people
Members of the Royal Swedish Academy of Sciences
Max Planck Institute directors